is a Japanese manga series written and illustrated by Hideo Yamamoto. The series follows Shinya Okama, a straight college student who works at an okama bar (a cross-dressing gay bar). Okama Report was serialized in the manga magazine Weekly Young Sunday from 1989 to 1991, and was adapted into a three-part original video animation (OVA) from 1991 to 1992.

Synopsis
While drunk at a party, college student Shinya Okama's friends dress him as a woman. He later sees a photograph of himself at the party, but with no recollection of the incident, he believes his own image to be that of a beautiful woman and falls in love at first sight with himself. Upon learning the truth, he is persuaded to work at an okama bar – a cross-dressing gay bar – where he adopts the drag persona of "Catherine". On his first night at the bar he meets Miki, a female college student and regular at the bar who looks exactly like Catherine. The series follows Shinya as he attempts to court Miki while concealing his true identity.

Characters
  
 Portrayed by: Ryō Horikawa (Shinya) and Yuri Amano (Catherine)
 A straight college student who works at an okama bar.
  
 Portrayed by: 
 A regular at the okama bar who Shinya falls in love with.
  
 Portrayed by: Issei Futamata
 Shinya's friend, who originally dressed him as a woman.

Media

Manga
Okama Report was serialized in the manga magazine Weekly Young Sunday from 1989 to 1991. It was written and illustrated by Hideo Yamamoto, and is noted as one of his sole works in the comedy genre. 

Its title is a parodic reference to "Gay Report", a report published by the LGBT rights group  (also known as OCCUR) noted as the first large-scale survey of gay life in Japan conducted by gay men. OCCUR protested Okama Report for containing what it argued were stereotypical and inaccurate depictions of LGBT people, particularly its failure to distinguish between gay male sexual orientation and transgender gender identity. In response, publisher Shogakukan ceased publishing collected tankōbon editions of the manga, discontinuing the release of the series after two volumes. 

The series was subsequently printed in full twice: as five tankōbon volumes published from October 1996 to June 1997, and as three bunkobon volumes published from May to June 2009. Both the 1996 and 2009 editions contain "On how to portray male homosexuals", a postscript from OCCUR noting that the series contains exaggerated and inaccurate depictions of LGBT people.

Original video animation (OVA)
Okama Report was adapted into a three-part original video animation (OVA) produced by Toshiba EMI from 1991 to 1992.

References

External links
 

1989 manga
1991 anime OVAs
Cross-dressing in anime and manga
LGBT in anime and manga
Seinen manga
Shogakukan manga